Charles Collin-Mezin Jr. (1870–1934) was a French violin maker, and an Officier de l'Académie des Beaux-Arts.

He collaborated with his father Charles Jean Baptiste Collin-Mezin, a famous Parisian luthier.

When his father died in 1923, the family's Mirecourt workshop was taken over by Charles Jr., who moved from his father's Paris workshop to Mirecourt in 1925. He also spent some time working in the United States.

All his labels say Paris, and display his father’s name. Therefore, he seems to have continued to produce instruments for his father.

His violins display high quality workmanship in the tradition of his father. Later in life he constructed some instruments of more original character.

His varnish is thick, with an Italian appearance.

Instruments from the Collin-Mezin workshop often represent superb "value for the money", especially for cellos and basses.

References 
A superb example of Collin Mezin violin: https://web.archive.org/web/20141021145203/http://www.alvarviolines.es/collin-mezin

French musical instrument makers
Luthiers from Mirecourt
Bowed string instrument makers
1870 births
1934 deaths
Luthiers from Paris